The Progressive Conservative Party (PCP) was a political party in Romania.

History
The party was established as a result of a split in the Conservative Party. In the 1919 elections it won 13 seats in the Chamber of Deputies and four in the Senate. However, it did not contest any further elections.

Election results

Legislative elections

References

Conservative parties in Romania
Defunct political parties in Romania